Events from the year 1475 in Ireland.

Incumbent
Lord: Edward IV

Births

Deaths
 Murchadh Reagh Ó Madadhan, Chief of Síol Anmchadha
 Cormac Ó Curnín,  a poet.